The Vatican Apostolic Library, more commonly known as the Vatican Library or informally as the Vat, is the library of the Holy See, located in Vatican City. It was formally established in 1475, although it is much older—it is one of the oldest libraries in the world and contains one of the most significant collections of historical texts. It has 75,000 codices from throughout history, as well as 1.1 million printed books, which include some 8,500 incunabula.

The Vatican Library is a research library for history, law, philosophy, science, and theology. The Vatican Library is open to anyone who can document their qualifications and research needs. Photocopies for private study of pages from books published between 1801 and 1990 can be requested in person or by mail.

Pope Nicholas V (1447–1455) envisioned a new Rome with extensive public works to lure pilgrims and scholars to the city to begin its transformation. Nicolas wanted to create a "public library" for Rome that was meant to be seen as an institution for humanist scholarship. His death prevented him from carrying out his plan, but his successor Pope Sixtus IV (1471–1484) established what is now known as the Vatican Library.

In March 2014, the Vatican Library began an initial four-year project of digitising its collection of manuscripts, to be made available online.

The Vatican Apostolic Archive was separated from the library at the beginning of the 17th century; it contains another 150,000 items.

Historical periods
Scholars have traditionally divided the history of the library into five periods, Pre-Lateran, Lateran, Avignon, Pre-Vatican and Vatican.

Pre-Lateran
The Pre-Lateran period, comprising the initial days of the library, dating from the earliest days of the Church. Only a handful of volumes survive from this period, though some are very significant.

At the Lateran
The Lateran era began when the library moved to the Lateran Palace and lasted until the end of the 13th century and the reign of Pope Boniface VIII, who died in 1303, by which time he possessed one of the most notable collections of illuminated manuscripts in Europe. However, in that year, the Lateran Palace was burnt and the collection plundered by Philip IV of France.

At Avignon
The Avignon period was during the Avignon Papacy, when seven successive popes resided in Avignon, France. This period saw great growth in book collection and record-keeping by the popes in Avignon, between the death of Boniface and the 1370s when the papacy returned to Rome.

Prior to establishment at the Vatican
The Pre-Vatican period ranged from about 1370 to 1447. The library was scattered during this time, with parts in Rome, Avignon, and elsewhere.where elsewhere? Pope Eugenius IV possessed 340 books by the time of his death.

At the Vatican
In 1451, bibliophile Pope Nicholas V sought to establish a public library at the Vatican, in part to re-establish Rome as a destination for scholarship. Nicholas combined some 350 Greek, Latin and Hebrew codices inherited from his predecessors with his own collection and extensive acquisitions, among them manuscripts from the imperial Library of Constantinople. Pope Nicholas also expanded his collection by employing Italian and Byzantine scholars to translate the Greek classics into Latin for his library. The knowledgeable pope already encouraged the inclusion of pagan classics. Nicolas was important in saving many of the Greek works and writings during this time period that he had collected while traveling and acquired from others.

In 1455, the collection had grown to 1200 books, of which 400 were in Greek.

Nicholas died in 1455. In 1475 his successor Pope Sixtus IV founded the Palatine Library. During his papacy, acquisitions were made in "theology, philosophy and artistic literature". The number of manuscripts is variously counted as 3,500 in 1475 or 2,527 in 1481, when librarian Bartolomeo Platina produced a signed listing. At the time it was the largest collection of books in the Western world.

Pope Julius II commissioned the expansion of the building. Around 1587, Pope Sixtus V commissioned the architect Domenico Fontana to construct a new building for the library, which is still used today. After this, it became known as the Vatican Library.

During the Counter-Reformation, access to the library's collections was limited following the introduction of the Index of banned books. Scholars' access to the library was restricted, particularly Protestant scholars. Restrictions were lifted during the course of the 17th century, and Pope Leo XIII was to formally reopen the library to scholars in 1883.

In 1756, the priest Antonio Piaggio, curator of ancient manuscripts at the Library used a machine he had invented to unroll the first Herculaneum papyri, an operation which took him months.

In 1809, Napoleon Bonaparte arrested Pope Pius VII and had the contents of the library seized and removed to Paris. They were returned in 1817, three years after Napoleon's defeat and abdication.

The library's first major revitalization project took place in the period between the two World Wars at the instigation of Pope Pius XI, himself a scholar and former librarian, with the cooperation of librarians from around the world. Until this point in time, while it had drawn on the expertise of numerous experts, the Vatican Library was dangerously lacking in organization and its junior librarians were undertrained. Foreign researchers, particularly Americans, noticed how inadequate the facilities were for such an important collection. Several American organizations, including the American Library Association and the Carnegie Endowment for International Peace, offered to assist in implementing a modern cataloguing system. Along with this, librarians from the Vatican Library were invited to visit several libraries in the United States to receive training on the functioning of a modern library. They visited the Library of Congress, and libraries in Princeton, Philadelphia, Baltimore, Pittsburg, Chicago, Champaign, Toronto, and Ann Arbor. Once back in Rome, a reorganization plan was implemented. The main goals were to create a summary index by author of each manuscript, and likewise a catalogue for the incunabula. Once the project was completed, the Vatican Library was one of the most modern in all of Europe. This joint effort highlighted the importance of international relationships in the  field of librarianship and led to the founding in 1929 of the International Federation of Library Associations, still at work.

In 1992 the library had almost 2 million catalogued items.

Among a number of thefts from the Library committed in modern times, in 1995 art history teacher Anthony Melnikas from Ohio State University stole three leaves from a medieval manuscript once owned by Francesco Petrarch. One of the stolen leaves contains an exquisite miniature of a farmer threshing grain. A fourth leaf from an unknown source was also discovered in his possession by U.S. Customs agents. Melnikas was trying to sell the pages to an art dealer, who then alerted the librarian director.

Location and building

The library is located inside the Vatican Palace, and the entrance is through the Belvedere Courtyard. When Pope Sixtus V (1585-1590) commissioned the expansion and the new building of the Vatican Library, he had a three-story wing built right across Bramante's Cortile del Belvedere, thus bisecting it and changing Bramante's work significantly. At the bottom of a grand staircase a large statue of Hippolytus decorates the La Galea entrance hall.

In the first semi-basement there is a papyrus room and a storage area for manuscripts. The first floor houses the restoration laboratory, and the photographic archives are on the second floor.

The library has  of shelving.

The library closed for renovations on 17 July 2007 and reopened on 20 September 2010. The three year, 9 million euro renovation involved the complete shut down of the library to install climate controlled rooms.

Architecture and art
In the Sala di Consultazione or main reference room of the Vatican Library looms a statue of St Thomas Aquinas (c. 1910), sculpted by Cesare Aureli. A second version of this statue (c. 1930) stands under the entrance portico of the Pontifical University of St Thomas Aquinas, Angelicum.

Library organization

Catalogue
The collection was originally organized through notebooks used to index the manuscripts. As the collection grew to more than a few thousand, shelf lists were used. The first modern catalogue system was put in place under Father Franz Ehrle between 1927 and 1939, using the Library of Congress card catalogue system. Ehrle also set up the first program to take photographs of important works or rare works. The library catalogue was further updated by Rev. Leonard E. Boyle when it was computerized in the early 1990s.

Reading and lending

Historically, during the Renaissance era, most books were not shelved but stored in wooden benches, which had tables attached to them. Each bench was dedicated to a specific topic. The books were chained to these benches, and if a reader took out a book, the chain remained attached to it. Until the early 17th century, academics were also allowed to borrow books. For important books, the pope himself would issue a reminder slip. Privileges to use the library could be withdrawn for breaking the house rules, for instance by climbing over the tables. Most famously Pico Della Mirandola lost the right to use the library when he published a book on theology that the Papal curia did not approve of. In the 1760s, a bill issued by Clement XIII heavily restricted access to the library's holdings.

The Vatican Library can be accessed by 200 scholars at a time, and it sees 4,000 to 5,000 scholars a year, mostly academics doing post-graduate research.

Collections

While the Vatican Library has always included Bibles, canon law texts, and theological works, it specialized from the beginning in secular books. Its collection of Greek and Latin classics was at the center of the revival of classical culture during the Renaissance age. The oldest documents in the library date back to the first century.

The library was founded primarily as a manuscript library, a fact reflected in the comparatively high ratio of manuscripts to printed works in its collection. Such printed books as have made their way into the collection are intended solely to facilitate the study of the much larger collection of manuscripts.

The collection also includes 330,000 Greek, Roman, and papal coins and medals.

Every year about 6,000 new books are acquired.

The library was enriched by several bequests and acquisitions over the centuries.

In 1623, in thanks for the adroit political maneuvers of Pope Gregory XV that had sustained him in his contests with Protestant candidates for the post of Electort, the hereditary Palatine Library of Heidelberg, containing about 3,500 manuscripts was given to the Holy See by Maximilian I, Duke of Bavaria. He had just acquired it as loot in the Thirty Years' War. A token 39 of the Heidelberg manuscripts were sent to Paris in 1797 and were returned to Heidelberg at the Peace of Paris in 1815. A gift of 852 others was made in 1816 by Pope Pius VII to the University of Heidelberg, including the Codex Manesse. Aside from these cases, the Palatine Library remains in the Vatican Library to this day.

In 1657, the manuscripts of the Dukes of Urbino were acquired. In 1661, the Greek scholar Leo Allatius was made librarian.

Queen Christina of Sweden's important library (mostly amassed by her generals as loot from Habsburg Prague and German cities during the Thirty Years War) was purchased on her death in 1689 by Pope Alexander VIII. It represented, for all practical purposes, the entire royal library of Sweden at the time. Had it remained where it was in Stockholm, it would all have been lost in the destruction of the royal palace by fire in 1697.

Among the most famous holdings of the library is the Codex Vaticanus Graecus 1209, the oldest known nearly complete manuscript of the Bible. The Secret History of Procopius was discovered in the library and published in 1623.

Pope Clement XI sent scholars into the Orient to bring back manuscripts, and is generally regarded as the founder of the library's Oriental section.

A School of library science is associated with the Vatican Library.

In 1959, a Film Library was established. This is not to be confused with the Vatican Film Library, which was established in 1953 at Saint Louis University in St. Louis, Missouri.

The library has a large collection of texts related to Hinduism, with the oldest editions dating to 1819.

During the library's restoration between 2007 and 2010, all of the 70,000 volumes in the library were tagged with electronic chips to prevent theft.

Manuscripts

Notable manuscripts in the library include:
Illuminated manuscripts:

Manuscripts relating to Christianity
Barberini Gospels
Gelasian Sacramentary, one of the oldest books on Christian liturgy
Joshua Roll
Lorsch Gospels, an illuminated gospel book written and illustrated from 778 to 820, which is spread up between various museums. The carved ivory rear cover and the Gospels of Luke and John are kept in the Vatican Library.
Menologion of Basil II
Vatican Croatian Prayer Book
Vergilius Vaticanus

Classic Greek and Latin texts
Vergilius Romanus, Virgil's Aeneid
Codex Vaticanus Ottobonianus Latinus 1829, an important 14th-century manuscript of Catullus' poems
Codex Vaticanus Latinus 3868, a 9th-century facsimile of Terence's comedies
Parts of Euclid's Elements, most notable Book I, Proposition 47, one of the oldest Greek texts on the Pythagorean Theorem

Alternative

Codex Borgia, an extensive Mesoamerican manuscript that depicts mythology and foundational rituals in the hieroglyphic texts and iconography made of animal skins.
Codex Vat. Arabo 368, the sole manuscript of the Hadith Bayad wa Riyad, an Arabic love story
Codex Vaticanus 3738, the Codex Ríos, an accordion folded Italian translation of a Spanish colonial-era manuscript, with copies of the Aztec paintings from the original Codex Telleriano-Remensis, believed to be written by the Dominican friar Ríos in 1566.
De arte venandi cum avibus, a Latin treatise on falconry in the format of a two-column parchment codex of 111 folios written in the 1240s.

Texts:

Codex Vaticanus Latinus 3256, four leaves of the Vergilius Augusteus
Codex Vaticano Rossi 215, fragments of the Rossi Codex
Codex Vaticanus Graecus 1209, one of the oldest extant Bibles in Greek language
Libri Carolini
Vaticanus Graecus 1001, the original manuscript of the Secret History
One fragment of Heliand and three fragments of the Old Saxon Genesis comprise the Palatinus Latinus 1447.

Qurans
The library contains over 100 Quran manuscripts from various collections, cataloged by the Italian Jewish linguist Giorgio Levi Della Vida: Vaticani arabi 73; Borgiani arabi 25; Barberiniani orientali 11; Rossiani 2. The largest manuscript in the library, Vat. Ar. 1484, measures 540x420mm. The smallest, Vat. Ar. 924, is a circle of 45mm diameter preserved in an octagonal case.

Digitization projects

In 2012, plans were announced to digitize, in collaboration with the Bodleian Library, a million pages of material from the Vatican Library.

On 20 March 2014, the Holy See announced that NTT Data Corporation and the library had concluded an agreement to digitize approximately 3,000 of the library's manuscripts within four years. NTT is donating the equipment and technicians, estimated to be worth 18 million Euros. It noted that there is the possibility of subsequently digitizing another 79,000 of the library's holdings. These will be high-definition images available on the library's Internet site. Storage for the holdings will be on a three petabyte server provided by EMC. It is expected that the initial phase will take four years.

DigiVatLib is the name of the Vatican Library's digital library service. It provides free access to the Vatican Library's digitized collections of manuscripts and incunabula.

The scanning of documents is impacted by the material used to produce the texts. Books using gold and silver in the illuminations require special scanning equipment. Digital copies are being served using the CIFS protocol, from network-attached storage hardware by Dell EMC.

Gallery of holdings

Related libraries

Vatican Apostolic Archive

The Vatican Apostolic Archive, located in Vatican City, is the central archive for all of the acts promulgated by the Holy See, as well as the state papers, correspondence, papal account books, and many other documents which the church has accumulated over the centuries. In the 17th century, under the orders of Pope Paul V, the Archives were separated from the Vatican Library, where scholars had some very limited access to them, and remained absolutely closed to outsiders until 1881, when Pope Leo XIII opened them to researchers, more than a thousand of whom now examine its documents each year.

Vatican Film Library

The Vatican Film Library in St. Louis, Missouri is the only collection, outside the Vatican itself, of microfilms of more than 37,000 works from the Biblioteca Apostolica Vaticana, the Vatican Library in Europe. It is located in the Pius XII Library on the campus of Saint Louis University. The library was created by Lowrie J. Daly (1914–2000), with funding from the Knights of Columbus. The goal was to make Vatican and other documents more available to researchers in North America.

Microfilming of Vatican manuscripts began in 1951, and according to the library's website, was the largest microfilming project that had been undertaken up to that date. The library opened in 1953, and moved to the St. Louis University campus, in the Pius XII Memorial Library, in 1959. The first librarian was Charles J. Ermatinger, who served until 2000. , the library has microfilmed versions of over 37,000 manuscripts, with material in Greek, Latin, Arabic, Hebrew and Ethiopic, as well as several more common Western European languages. There are reproductions of many works from the Biblioteca Palatina and Biblioteca Cicognara at the Vatican, as well as Papal letter registers from the Archivio Segreto Vaticano (Vatican Secret Archives) from the 9th to 16th centuries, in the series Registra Vaticana and Registra Supplicationium.

Staff
The nominal head of the library has often over the centuries been made a cardinal and hence given the title Cardinal Librarian. The effective directors, often distinguished scholars, were in an earlier period called "Custodians. After the reopening of the library in 1883, Pope Leo XIII changed the title to Prefect.

The library currently has some 80 staff who work in five departments: manuscripts and archival collections, printed books/drawings, acquisitions/cataloguing, coin collections/museums and restoration/photography.

List of librarians
(P) Indicates time spent as pro-librarian. this is the role of acting librarian, often a librarian who is not a cardinal.

See also

 Archive of the Congregation for the Doctrine of the Faith
 Index of Vatican City-related articles
 The Vatican Splendors

Notes

References

Works cited
 Cardinals of the Holy Roman Church -

Further reading
Hanson, James Christian Meinich. “Cataloguing Rules of the Vatican Library.” Library Quarterly 1 (January 3, 1931): 340–46.
Rome Reborn: The Vatican Library & Renaissance Culture, an online exhibition from the Library of Congress.
 Vatican to digitize Apostolic Library of 1.6 million volumes for general perusal, PCWorld.com, 29 October 2002. A joint effort between the Vatican and Hewlett-Packard.

External links

 Official website
 Vatican Library old home page, with online catalog search
 History of the Vatican Library, from the Library's site
 Treasures of the Vatican Library Exposed via The European Library
 Toward On-line, worldwide access to Vatican Library materials (1996). A collaborative effort (pioneered by Fr. Leonard Boyle OP Prefect of the Vatican Library) between the Vatican Library and IBM, the primary goal of which is to "provide access via the Internet to some of the Library's most valuable manuscripts, printed books, and other sources to a scholarly community around the world."
 Knights of Columbus Vatican Film Library. Saint Louis University library that focuses on the collection of the Vatican Library.
 The Secret History of Art by Noah Charney on the Vatican Library and Procopius. An article by art historian Noah Charney about the Vatican Library and its famous manuscript, Historia Arcana by Procopius.
The Vatican: spirit and art of Christian Rome, a book from The Metropolitan Museum of Art Libraries (fully available online as PDF), which contains material on the library (p. 280-290)

 
1448 establishments in Europe
Libraries established in the 15th century
Vatican City culture